Arum sintenisii, known as Sintenis arum, is a flowering plant species in the family Araceae.

Description
Arum sintenisii is a tuberous herbs that spreads clonally through discoid horizontally-oriented tubers. Flowers are borne on a spadix, partially enclosed in a  green spathe with a purple internal lining.

Germination is epigeal.

Habitat

It grows in uncultivated Olea europaea groves at altitudes of 50 to 200 meters near Kythrea in northern Cyprus. It was recently reported from southwestern Turkey.

Taxonomy

Within the genus Arum, it belongs to subgenus Arum, section Dioscoridea, and subsection Hygrophila. It was previously thought to be a variety or subspecies of Arum orientale in subsection Dischroochiton, but recent studies support a closer relationship with Arum hygrophilum. A. sintenisii differs from A. orientale in the smell (sweet in A. sintenisii, foetid in A. orientale) and presentation of the inflorescence (produced at leaf level in A. sintenisii, below leaves in A. orientale), and the two were recognized as distinct in 1995. A. sintenisii also differs in its larger size. A. sintenisii has also been confused with A. hygrophilum; many records of A. hygrophilum from Cyprus are likely misidentifications of this species.

A. sintenisii is diploid, with a chromosome count of 2n = 28.

Uses

Cultivated
Arum sintenisii is cultivated as an ornamental plant, and is reported to survive mild winters in South East England.

References

External links

Garden plants of Europe
Flora of Europe
Flora of Turkey
Flora of Cyprus
sintenisii